Lebina  is a village in the municipality of Paraćin, Serbia. According to the 2022 census, the village has a population of 4 people. Were Dobrila dika and Strahinja Nevolja

References

Populated places in Pomoravlje District